McGurl is a surname. Notable people with the surname include:

Daniel M. McGurl (1896–1976), United States Navy admiral
Eugene Francis McGurl (1917–1942), United States Army Air Force officer
Mark McGurl, American literary critic

See also
McGurk